Drissa Diallo (born 4 January 1973 in Mauritania) is a Guinean former professional footballer who most recently played for Cheltenham Town. Although he holds French nationality, he represented Guinea on eight occasions at international level.

Career
After playing for Sedan, Liege and Denize, Diallo signed for KV Mechelen in 1998. In 2003 Mechelen went into liquidation and Diallo was released on a free transfer. He promptly moved to England and signed for Burnley. Although the Lancashire club were keen to sign Diallo on a long term deal after he had impressed Stan Ternent during his time at the club, Diallo spent just 5 months in Burnley before Joe Royle swooped to sign him for Ipswich Town at the end of the season. He scored two goals for Burnley, against Fulham in the FA Cup and Gillingham in the league.

Career statistics

International
Source:

Honours
Milton Keynes Dons
Football League Two: 2007–08
Football League Trophy: 2007–08

References

External links
Drissa Diallo profile at Ipswich Town Talk

1973 births
Living people
People from Dakhlet Nouadhibou Region
French footballers
French sportspeople of Mauritanian descent
Mauritanian footballers
French sportspeople of Guinean descent
Citizens of Guinea through descent
Guinean footballers
Guinea international footballers
Association football defenders
CS Sedan Ardennes players
RFC Liège players
K.M.S.K. Deinze players
K.V. Mechelen players
Burnley F.C. players
Ipswich Town F.C. players
Sheffield Wednesday F.C. players
Milton Keynes Dons F.C. players
Cheltenham Town F.C. players
Ligue 2 players
English Football League players
Black French sportspeople